Darul Uloom Nadwatul Ulama is an Islamic seminary in Lucknow, India. Established on 26 September 1898 by the Nadwatul Ulama, it is one of the major Islamic institutions in India.

The manager (nāzim) of the Nadwatul Ulama is the chancellor (sarparast/patron) of the Darul Uloom Nadwatul Ulama and the Principal is the executive head of the seminary.

List of chancellors

List of principals

References

Bibliography
 
 

Academic staff of Darul Uloom Nadwatul Ulama
Lists of academic chancellors and vice chancellors
 
People by university or college in Uttar Pradesh